Snezana Lawrence  is a Yugoslav and British historian of mathematics and a senior lecturer in mathematics and design engineering at Middlesex University.

Education and career
Lawrence is originally from Yugoslavia, of mixed Serbian and Jewish ancestry. She studied descriptive geometry at the University of Belgrade before moving to England in 1991 during the Breakup of Yugoslavia and ensuing Yugoslav Wars, and later becoming a naturalized British citizen. She earned her PhD from the Open University in 2002. Her dissertation, Geometry of Architecture and Freemasonry in 19th Century England, was supervised by Jeremy Gray.

While working as a secondary school teacher at St Edmund's Catholic School, Dover in 2004–2005, she won a Gatsby Teacher Fellowship in Mathematics, with which she started a popular web site "Maths is Good For You". The site had the aim of providing a resource to bring more work on the history of mathematics into the secondary school curriculum.

Subsequently, Lawrence moved to post-secondary education, including work as a senior lecturer at Bath Spa University, Anglia Ruskin University, and Middlesex University.

Books
Lawrence is the co-editor, with Irish mathematician Mark McCartney, of the book Mathematicians and their Gods: Interactions between mathematics and religious beliefs (Oxford University Press, 2015), on connections between mathematics and religion. She is the author of A New Year’s Present from a Mathematician (Chapman Hall / CRC Press, 2019), on the nature of mathematics and the definition of mathematicians.

Recognition
Lawrence is a Fellow of the Institute of Mathematics and its Applications, for whom she is Diversity Champion and an elected council member.

References

External links
Math is good for you
The Monge project

Year of birth missing (living people)
Living people
Yugoslav emigrants to the United Kingdom
British women mathematicians
British women historians
British historians of mathematics
Alumni of the Open University
Academics of Bath Spa University
Academics of Middlesex University
Fellows of the Institute of Mathematics and its Applications